During the 1968–69 Scottish football season, Celtic competed in Scottish Division One.

Results

Scottish Division One

Scottish Cup

Scottish League Cup

European Cup

Glasgow Cup

See also
Nine in a row

References

Scottish football championship-winning seasons
Celtic F.C. seasons
Celtic